Salanquch (also Romanized as Sālānqūch; also known as Sālān Gūch and Sālānfūj) is a village in Shirin Darreh Rural District, in the Central District of Quchan County, Razavi Khorasan Province, Iran. At the 2006 census, its population was 337, in 81 families.

References 

Populated places in Quchan County